Fake is the second and final album by British alternative rock band Adorable, released in 1994.  The sound of the album was influenced by American indie rock, a shift from the Britpop of the band's debut. The album sold poorly, and Adorable were dropped from their label.

Reception
Trouser Press wrote that Fake "meets the sophomore challenge with surprising grace and ease. A more coherent, ambitious album that flows far better than its predecessor, it possesses twice the bite, more interesting guitar passages and an underlying obstinacy that fuels the immaculately built tunes."

Track listing
"Feed Me" – 3:29
"Vendetta" – 4:10
"Man in a Suitcase" – 4:48
"Submarine" – 4:29
"Lettergo" – 3:59
"Kangaroo Court" – 3:27
"Radio Days" – 3:36
"Go Easy on Her" – 4:33
"Road Movie" – 4:17
"Have You Seen the Light" – 4:49

Personnel
Piotr Fijalkowski - (vocals, guitar)
Robert Dillam - (guitar)
Stephen 'Wil' Williams - (bass) 
Kevin Gritton - (drums)

References

1994 albums
Creation Records albums
Adorable (band) albums